The Musée de l'Ordre de la Libération is a military museum located in the 7th arrondissement of Paris, France. The museum is dedicated to the Ordre de la Libération, France's second national order after the Légion d'honneur, which was created in 1940 by General Charles de Gaulle, leader of the Free French Forces. In 1967 de Gaulle moved the Order of the Liberation into Les Invalides.

Display cases contain more than 4,000 objects including uniforms, weapons, clandestine press and leaflets, transmitters, flags taken to the enemy on the battlefields of Africa and Europe, the first naval flags of Free France, and relics from the camps. The hall of honor is dedicated to General de Gaulle.

See also 
 List of museums in Paris

References

External links
 Musée de l'Ordre de la Libération
 Paris.org entry
 Paris.fr entry

Museums in Paris
Military and war museums in France
Buildings and structures in the 7th arrondissement of Paris